Huayllatarpuna (possibly from Quechua waylla meadow, tarpuy to sow, -na a suffix,  "where the meadow is sown") is a mountain in the Chila mountain range in the Andes of Peru, about  high. It is situated in the Arequipa Region, Castilla Province, Chachas District. Huayllatarpuna lies in a remote, mountainous area east of Orcopampa. la primera ascencion fue realizada por Rolando Huamani Cueva en agosto del 2017.

References

Mountains of Peru
Mountains of Arequipa Region